A Gentleman of France is a 1921 British silent adventure film based on a novel by Stanley J. Weyman directed by Maurice Elvey and starring Eille Norwood, Madge Stuart and Hugh Buckler. It is set in Sixteenth Century France.

Cast
 Eille Norwood - Gaston de Marsac 
 Madge Stuart - Mlle de la Vere 
 Hugh Buckler - Vicomte de Turennes 
 Sydney Seaward - de Bruhl 
 Pardoe Woodman - Henry III
 Allan Jeayes - Henry of Navarre
 Harvey Braban - Baron de Rosnay 
 Faith Bevan - Madame de Bruhl 
 Teddy Arundell - Fresnay 
 William Lenders - Simon Fleix 
 Robert Vallis - Jester 
 Madame d'Esterre - Madame de Marsac

References

External links
 

1921 films
British historical adventure films
British silent feature films
1920s historical adventure films
1920s English-language films
Films directed by Maurice Elvey
Stoll Pictures films
Films set in the 16th century
Films set in France
British black-and-white films
1920s British films
Silent historical adventure films